Matt Figger is an American college basketball coach and current head coach for the Texas–Rio Grande Valley Vaqueros men's basketball team. He previously served as the head coach at Austin Peay.

Coaching career
Figger got his college coaching start at Wabash Valley in 1993 as an assistant coach, before moving on to Vincennes and Odessa College to serve as an assistant coach. Figger also had assistant coaching stops at South Alabama, and Arkansas before landing on Frank Martin's staff at Kansas State. Figger followed Martin as an assistant coach to South Carolina. Figger was a part of the Gamecocks Final Four appearance in the 2017 NCAA tournament.

On April 6, 2017, Figger was named the 12th head coach in Austin Peay history, taking over for longtime coach Dave Loos. 

In March 2021, Figger left Austin Peay to become the head coach at UT Rio Grande Valley.

Head coaching record

References

External links
 Austin Peay profile
 South Carolina profile

Living people
American men's basketball coaches
Austin Peay Governors men's basketball coaches
UT Rio Grande Valley Vaqueros men's basketball coaches
Basketball coaches from Kentucky
Eastern Kentucky University alumni
Kansas State Wildcats men's basketball coaches
People from Jenkins, Kentucky
South Alabama Jaguars men's basketball coaches
South Carolina Gamecocks men's basketball coaches
Vincennes Trailblazers men's basketball coaches
Wabash Valley Warriors men's basketball coaches
Year of birth missing (living people)